Bexwell is a small village and former civil parish near Downham Market, now in the parish of Ryston, in the King's Lynn and West Norfolk district, in the county of Norfolk, England. In 1931 the parish had a population of 60. On 1 April 1935 the parish was abolished and merged with Ryston.

The villages name means 'Beac's spring/stream'.

Its church, St Mary's, is one of 124 existing round-tower churches in Norfolk. It is a Grade II* listed building.

A stone barn which stands beside the A1122 is thought to be the remains of a late c15 gatehouse to the former manor of Bexwell.

One man is known to have died fighting in the First World War from Bexwell, Second-Lieutenant Charles D. Prangley (1897-1916), 1st Battalion, Lincolnshire Regiment. He occupies grave V.D.7. of the Guards Cemetery, Lesboeufs and is commemorated on the Denver war memorial.

References

External links
St Mary's Church website
St Mary's on the European Round Tower Churches Website

Villages in Norfolk
Former civil parishes in Norfolk
King's Lynn and West Norfolk